Reif is a surname and given name. Notable people with the name include:

Surname 
Alberto Reif (1946–2012), Italian football player
Arnold E. Reif (born 1924), American cancer researcher
Chris Reif, American soccer player
Christian Reif (born 1984), German long jumper
Emil Reif (born 1998), Danish Counter-Strike player
Frederick Reif (1927–2019), American physicist
Gertrude Reif Hughes (1936-2022), American professor of English
John F. Reif (born 1951), American judge
John Reif (born 1951), American academic
L. Rafael Reif (born 1950), American educator
Marcel Reif (born 1949), German journalist
Patricia Reif (1930–2002), American philosopher and theologian
Robert W. Reif (1921-2011), American politician and physician
Sepp Reif (born 1937), German ice hockey player
Stefan Reif (born 1944), Scottish academic
Timothy M. Reif (born 1959), American jurist and lawyer

Given name 
Reif Larsen, American author

See also
Reiff (disambiguation)
Reif-Gintl

Occupational surnames